Axtell is an unincorporated community in Macon County, Missouri, United States.

References

Unincorporated communities in Macon County, Missouri
Unincorporated communities in Missouri